Singleton Strikers Football Club is a semi-professional football club based in Singleton in the Hunter Region, New South Wales. Singleton Strikers currently compete in the Northern NSW State League Division 1 with teams in First Grade, Reserve Grade and U'18s.

The Northern NSW State League Division 1 is the second tier of football in NNSW below the National Premier Leagues Northern NSW.

The Singleton Strikers were crowned champions in the 2020 season, defeating New Lambton 2-0 in the grand final at Magic Park, Captained by the leagues Player of The Year Hayden Nichols. COYS

External links 
 Singleton Strikers FC – 

1978 establishments in Australia
Association football clubs established in 1978
Soccer clubs in Newcastle, New South Wales